The Dude Goes West is a 1948 American comedy western film starring Eddie Albert and Gale Storm. It was directed by Kurt Neumann and released by Monogram Pictures. The film was originally known as Tombstone.

Plot
Gunsmith and marksman Daniel Bone closes his Brooklyn, New York business and travels west, where he feels that he belongs. On a train, he encounters passenger Liza Crockett. After witnessing the theft of her purse, Dan confronts the thief, disarms him and throws off the train. The thief is a notorious outlaw called the Pecos Kid who vows revenge against "the dude" who interfered with his holdup. Liza mistakenly believes that it was Dan who had tried to steal her bag.

They part ways, but later encounter one another in the desert, as Liza makes her way to Arsenic City, Nevada, where a map to her father's gold mine might make Liza a wealthy woman.  On their way, riding in her buckboard, Indians capture them.  Dan's knowledge of their language and some minor "magic" impresses the tribe's chief and he treats them as his guests.

After arriving in Arsenic City, the two encounter another outlaw, Texas Jack Barton, and a corrupt saloonkeeper, Kiki Kelly, who are both interested in the mine. Dan finds the map, memorizes it and burns it. He falls in love with Liza and leads her to the gold. When the outlaws ambush them, their new Indian friends ride to their rescue.

Cast
 Eddie Albert as Dan Bone
 Gale Storm as Liza Crockett
 Gilbert Roland as the Pecos Kid
 James Gleason as Sam Briggs
 Barton MacLane as Texas Jack
 Binnie Barnes as Kiki Kelly
 Sarah Padden as Mrs. Hulskamp

References

External links
 
 
 
 

1948 films
1948 Western (genre) films
American Western (genre) films
American black-and-white films
Films directed by Kurt Neumann
Allied Artists films
1940s American films
1940s English-language films